The Chickasaw County School District is a public school district based in Houston, Mississippi (USA).

On June 30, 2021 the Houston School District and the former Chickasaw County School District were dissolved, with a new Chickasaw County School District formed on July 1, 2021. The former school boards were dissolved and a new consolidated board was formed. The districts were consolidated due to a change in Mississippi law that required the consolidation.

The former Chickasaw County district was headquartered in Houlka.

Schools
Chickasaw County School District operates six schools  
Houston Lower Elementary (Grades K-2)
Houston Upper Elementary (Grade 3-5)
Houston Middle School (Grades 6-8)
Houston High School (Grades 9-12)
Houston Career and Technical Education Center (Vocational Grades 10-12, AEST Grades 9-12)
Houlka Attendance Center (the only school of the pre-merger district)
Elementary School (Grades K-6)
High School (Grades 7-12)

Demographics

2006-07 school year
There were a total of 526 students enrolled in the pre-merger Chickasaw County School District during the 2006–2007 school year. The gender makeup of the district was 46% female and 54% male. The racial makeup of the district was 46.20% African American, 49.81% White, and 3.99% Hispanic. 62.1% of the district's students were eligible to receive free lunch.

Previous school years

Accountability statistics

See also
List of school districts in Mississippi

References

External links

Education in Chickasaw County, Mississippi
School districts in Mississippi
2021 establishments in Mississippi
Educational institutions established in 2021